Weesp is an alternative post-metal band from Minsk, Belarus. The band style can be described as a mix of heavy and recognizable riffing, groovy drumming beats, analogue synth sounds, and melodic expressional vocals. Even though band members used to call  their style alternative rock, some music journalists describe  it as “combination of metal and rock genres”, and some songs they define  as nu-metal.

Early years 
Band front man Lex Falco together with Michail (Mike) Zalucky (guitar) formed the band in Minsk when they both were studying in high school in the middle of the 2000s. Later, the rest of the members joined and, in 2009, the band finally announced its name - "WEESP" and immediately released the Taste of Steel EP]. ( Weesp is the name of a village in the Netherlands.) Inspired by such bands as The Prodigy, Nine Inch Nails, Red Hot Chili Peppers, Korn and Metallica, they formed their own sound: a combination of heavy riffs with melodic and classic synth sounds.

After the next EP release This will destroy us  (2011), Weesp performed at concerts and festivals.

2015 - The Void
On 20 August 2015, Weesp released their first full album The Void on which they had been working from 2012). The recording had been postponed for a long time. According to frontman, Lex Falco the  “album reflects  feelings and experience from the last 10 years of our lives. This is why the sound and mood of the album at times differ a lot if you listen to different songs. This album has both vivid teenager impressions and bitter life lessons”.

The album includes a few tracks in collaboration with Cory Brandan from Norma Jean. Brandon features in the "Solar Empire" and “Everything Burns” tracks.

Unlike previous albums, The Void was not recorded in the band's home city but at the Polish studio  Hertz  by the Wieslawski brothers, who were working with such bands as Behemoth and Vader. The mastering was done at Turtle Tone studio.

2018 - Black Sails
Weesp released the  "Illumination" single at the end of 2017, together with the official video. 

The band released two more singles in February and March 2018 - "Not Over" and "Who We Are" and in addition a "Not Over" official music video.

2019 - Crystal Clear Waters
On September 11, 2019, Weesp released their new album, Crystal Clean Waters. The band filmed music videos for new versions of "Illumination", "Red Neon Glow" and "Monsters" songs, which are on YouTube.

2020 - Pain 
On September 11, Weesp's new album, Pain, was released. It includes 8 tracks in Russian.

2022 - The Path in the Dark 
On September 1, the new single "The Time Will Come" was released from the upcoming album called "The Way in the Dark", which the band will present in the winter of 2023.

On October 6, another single was released called "We will not be found" from the aforementioned album "The Way in the Dark".

On November 30, the group released a single called "Dirt".

On January 31, a new track "The Abyss Looked At Me" was released.

Discography

Studio albums 
 2009 – tasteofsteel

 2011 – This Will Destroy Us

 2015 – The Void

 2018 - Black Sails

 2019 – Crystal Clean Waters

 2020 – Pain

Singles 
 2009 — "Exodus: origins"
 2011 — "Our Own Gale"
 2013 — "Caves unplugged"
 2015 — "Murderers"
 2015 — "Solar Empire"
 2017 — "Illumination"
 2018 — "Not Over"
 2018 — "Who We Are"
 2020 — «Iron Region»
 2020 — «Shot In The Sky»
 2022 — «There Will Come A Time»
 2022 — «We Won't Be Found»
 2022 — «Dirt»
 2023 — «The Abyss Looked At Me»

Live 
 2010 — Livan
 2011 — "Omen" (The Prodigy cover)

Music videos 
 2011 – "Livan"
 2013 – "Caves unplugged"
 2013 – "Our Own Gale" (lyric-video)
 2013 – "Sub"
 2015 – "Murderers"
 2015 – "Solar Empire"
 2017 – "Illumination"
 2018 – "Not Over"
 2018 – "Who We Are"
 2018 – "Black Sails"
 2019 – "Crystal Clean Waters"

Members 
 Alexei (Lex) Falco – vocals, piano
 Michail (Mike) Zalucky – guitars
 Dmitry (Mi) Budzko – bass
 Stanislav (Stak) Budzko – electronics
 Maxim (Max) Sudakov – drums

References

External links 
 Weesp official web-site 

Belarusian rock music groups